The Federación Sindical Única de Trabajadores Campesinos de Cochabamba is a political activist organization based out of Cochabamba.

Political activism
Organisations based in Bolivia